Enathi is a village in the Pattukkottai taluk of Thanjavur district, Tamil Nadu, India. A small river is crossing this village, which is used for agriculture. It has the famous temple of Chelliamman, situated into a small forest, festival is celebrated every year in the Tamil month of Adi. Enathi Rajappa College of Arts and Science is located here to provide good education. Former M.L.A. of Pattukkottai assembly (1996–2001) Enathi P. Balasubramanian was born here.

Schools 
Panchayat Union Primary School and Government High School

Demographics 

As per the 2001 census, Eanathi had a population of 3089 with 1485 males and 1554 females. The literacy rate was 67.97%.

References 

 

Villages in Thanjavur district